Cape Girardeau (colloquially referred to as "Cape") is a city in Cape Girardeau  and Scott Counties in the U.S. state of Missouri. At the 2020 census, the population was 39,540. The city is one of two principal cities of the Cape Girardeau-Jackson, MO-IL Metropolitan Statistical Area, which encompasses Alexander County, Illinois, Bollinger County, Missouri and Cape Girardeau County, Missouri and has a population of 97,517. The city is the economic center of Southeast Missouri and also the home of Southeast Missouri State University.

History

The city is named after Jean Baptiste de Girardot, who established a temporary trading post in the area around 1733. He was a French soldier stationed at Kaskaskia between 1704 and 1720 in the French colony of La Louisiane. The "Cape" in the city name referred to a rock promontory overlooking the Mississippi River; it was later destroyed by railroad construction. Genevieve, had been referred to as Cape Girardot or Girardeau (both pronounced the same in French).

The settlement of Girardeau is said to date from 1793 when the Spanish government, which had acquired Louisiana in 1764 following the French defeat in the Seven Years' War, granted Louis Lorimier, a French-Canadian, the right to establish a trading post. This gave him trading privileges and a large tract of land surrounding his post.  Lorimier was made commandant of the district and prospered from the returns on his land sales and trade with indigenous peoples, such as the Ozark Bluff Dwellers and the Mississippian people.

Also in 1793, Baron Carondelet granted land near Cape Girardeau to the Black Bob Band of the Hathawekela Shawnee, who had migrated from across the Mississippi River. The Band became known as the Cape Girardeau Shawnee. They successfully resisted removal to Indian Territory with the rest of the Shawnee tribe until 1833.

In 1799, American settlers founded the first English school west of the Mississippi River in Cape Girardeau at a landmark called Mount Tabor, named by the settlers for the Biblical Mount Tabor.

The town of Cape Girardeau was incorporated in 1808, prior to Missouri statehood. It was reincorporated as a city in 1843. The advent of the steamboat in 1835 and related river trade stimulated the development of Cape Girardeau as the biggest port on the Mississippi River between St. Louis, Missouri and Memphis, Tennessee.

During the Civil War, the city was the site of the Battle of Cape Girardeau on April 26, 1863. The Union and Confederate armies engaged in a minor four-hour skirmish, each sustaining casualties generally believed to be in the low double-digits.

For years travelers had to use ferries to cross the Mississippi River from Cape Girardeau. In September 1928 a bridge was completed between Missouri and Illinois.

The Old Federal Courthouse, located at Broadway and Fountain Streets and built in the late 1940s, was the subject of a U.S. Supreme Court case when it was being developed. In United States v. Carmack, 329 U.S. 230 (1946), the Court upheld the federal government's authority under the Condemnation Act of 1888 to seize land owned by a state or locality.

In December 2003, the "Old Bridge" was succeeded by a new four-lane cable-stayed bridge crossing the Mississippi River at Cape Girardeau. Its official name is "The Bill Emerson Memorial Bridge.", honoring former U.S. Rep. Bill Emerson (R-Mo.) The "Old Bridge" was demolished after the Emerson Bridge opened.

The City of Cape Girardeau was recognized in January 2008 by First Lady Laura Bush as a Preserve America Community for its work in surveying and protecting historic buildings.

The city is known to some as "The City of Roses" because of a  stretch of highway that was once lined with dozens of rose bushes. Although there used to be many prominent rose gardens around the community, few of these gardens have been maintained. The city is also known as "Cape Girardeau: Where the River Turns a Thousand Tales," due to the history of the town and the Mississippi River.

Historic landmarks

Numerous murals commemorate the city's history. The largest is the Mississippi River Tales Mural, located on the city's downtown floodwall. Behind the floodwall lies the Riverfront Park of Cape Girardeau Missouri, where riverboats dock and visitors can view the Mississippi River.

There are 39 historic sites in Cape Girardeau that are listed on the National Register of Historic Places.  Of these, eight are historic districts, such as Cape Girardeau Commercial Historic District, which was listed in 2000 and includes multiple contributing properties.  The growth of the town can be documented through Sanborn maps, over 80 of which are available online.  Other landmarks include the Fort D Historic Site and the Confederate War Memorial.

Among the city's older cemeteries are Apple Creek Cemetery, Salem Cemetery, and Old Lorimier Cemetery.

Geography
Cape Girardeau is located at  (37.309042, −89.546498). The "cape" that the city is named after no longer exists. A rock which remains from the previously existing cape can be seen on a promontory which overlooks the Mississippi River in Cape Rock Park.

Climate
Cape Girardeau has a humid subtropical climate (Köppen Cfa) with four distinct seasons and is located in USDA Plant Hardiness Zone 6b. Winter typically brings a mix of rain, sleet, and snow, with occasional heavy snowfall and icing.

Demographics

The Cape Girardeau-Jackson, MO-IL metropolitan area is part of the Cape Girardeau-Sikeston-Jackson, MO-IL CSA and as of 2019 had a population of 135,045.

2010 census
As of the census of 2010, there were 37,941 people, 15,205 households, and 8,466 families residing in the city. As of July 2021, it is estimated that the racial makeup of the city was 80.6% White (78.2% Non-Hispanic White), 12.7% Black or African American, 0.00% Native American, 3.0% Asian, 0.2% Native Hawaiian or Pacific Islander, and 3.0% from two or more races. Hispanic or Latino of any race were 3.1% of the population. 

There were 15,205 households, out of which 26.0% had children under the age of 18 living in them, 38.8% were married couples living together, 12.8% had a female householder with no husband present, 4.0% had a male householder with no wife present, and 44.3% were non-families. 33.6% of all households were made up of individuals, and 11.4% had someone living alone who was 65 years of age or older. The average household size was 2.27 and the average family size was 2.89.

In the city, the population was spread out, with 19.3% under the age of 18, 20.2% between the ages of 18 and 24, 23.5% from 25 to 44, 22.2% from 45 to 64, and 14.7% who were 65 years of age or older. The median age in the city was 32.1 years. The gender makeup of the city was 47.4% male and 52.6% female.

2000 census
As of the census of 2000, there were 35,349 people, 14,380 households, and 8,297 families residing in the city. The population density was 1,456.5 people per square mile (562.4/km). There were 15,827 housing units at an average density of 652.1 per square mile (251.8/km). The racial makeup of the city was 87.32% White, 9.30% Black or African American, 1.13% Asian, 0.39% Native American, 0.04% Pacific Islander, 0.43% from other races, and 1.40% from two or more races. Hispanic or Latino of any race were 1.10% of the population.

There were 14,380 households, of which 25.7% had children under the age of 18 living in them, 43.8% were married couples living together, 10.9% had a female householder with no husband present, and 42.3% were non-families. 33.6% of all households were made up of individuals, and 11.5% had someone living alone who was 65 years of age or older. The average household size was 2.24 and the average family size was 2.90.

In the city, the population was spread out, with 20.5% under the age of 18, 18.4% from ages 18 to 24, 25.6% from 25 to 44, 19.9% from 45 to 64, and 15.5% were 65 years of age or older. The median age was 34 years. For every 100 females, there were 89.5 males. For every 100 females age 18 and over, there were 86.9 males.

The median income for a household in the city was $36,502, and the median income for a family was $47,592. Males had a median income of $31,575 versus $21,392 for females. The per capita income for the city was $21,877. About 8.5% of families and 15.2% of the population were below the poverty line, including 16.5% of those under age 18 and 8.6% of those age 65 and over.

Economy

According to the Cape Girardeau Chamber of Commerce, there are more than 100 employers in Cape Girardeau who employ at least 100 workers. The top employers in the city are:

Health
St. Francis HealthCare System serves the Cape Girardeau area. This system contains six different centers. St. Francis offers immediate care in Cape Girardeau and Perryville. Landmark Hospital is a 30-bed facility that treats patients with catastrophic or chronic medical conditions. St. Francis also has joint partnership with the Physician Alliance Surgery Center, which performs ear, nose, throat, and general surgery. The Black River Medical Center offers three beds and an emergency room. The main medical center is a 308-bed facility in Cape Girardeau that serves over 650,000 people. Patients come from Missouri, Kentucky, Tennessee, Illinois, and Arkansas. Some of the services offered at the main campus are the Neurosciences Institute, Orthopedic Institute, Family BirthPlace, Heart Hospital, Emergency and Trauma Center, Cancer Institute, and Fitness Plus.

Southeast Health is a health care system with its main facility, Southeast Missouri Hospital, located in Cape Girardeau. This healthcare system serves patients from southeast Missouri, western Kentucky, southern Illinois, and northern Arkansas. Southeast Health also has a cancer center, heart center, fitness center, breast care and diagnostic center, campus health clinic, diabetes center, pharmacy, and hospice. Additional hospice services, including respite for caregivers and grief & bereavement services can be found at Crown Hospice, which serves the Cape Girardeau and Poplar Bluff areas.

Government

Municipal
Cape Girardeau is a home rule city that utilizes the council-manager form of government. The Cape Girardeau City Council is the elected governing body. The city council consists of the mayor and six city council members. The mayor is directly elected at-large (citywide) for a four-year term and the city council members are elected from six wards for staggered four-year terms. Cape Girardeau elected its first female mayor, Stacy Kinder, in the 2022 Mayoral race. 

List of Cape Girardeau Mayors

State and federal
In the Missouri General Assembly, Cape Girardeau is in the 27th Senate District and is currently represented by Republican Holly Rehder. Most of the city is included in the 147th Legislative District; small northern portions of the city are in the 146th Legislative District, represented by Republican Barry Hovis.

In the U.S. House of Representatives, Cape Girardeau is in Missouri's 8th Congressional District and is currently represented by Republican Jason T. Smith of Salem in Dent County.

Presidential
{| class="wikitable"  style="float:right; margin:1em; font-size:95%;"
|+ Cape Girardeau city vote by party in presidential elections
|- style="background:lightgrey;"
! Year
! Democratic
! Republican
! Third Parties
|-
|align="center" |2020
|align="center" |40.90% 6,381
|align="center" |57.10% 8,911|align="center" |2.0% 318
|-
|align="center" |2016
|align="center" |32.80% 5,042
|align="center" |62.50% 9,625
|align="center" |4.70% 728
|-
|align="center" |2012
|align="center" |35.34% 5,143
|align="center" |62.40% 9,081
|align="center" |2.25% 328
|-
|align="center" |2008
|align="center" |39.90% 6,275
|align="center" |58.83% 9,252
|align="center" |1.28% 201
|-
|align="center" |2004
|align="center" |35.72% 5,430
|align="center" |63.44% 9,645
|align="center" |0.84% 128
|-
|align="center" |2000
|align="center" |35.26% 4,792
|align="center" |62.22% 8,456
|align="center" |2.52% 342
|-
|align="center" |1996
|align="center" |38.79% 5,582
|align="center" |54.64%' 7,863|align="center" |6.57% 946|}

During the 2020 Democratic presidential primaries, Democrats in the city gave a majority of their votes to former Vice President Joe Biden. He received 1,635 votes (54.88%) out of the total 2,979 votes cast in the city. Bernie Sanders, who had won the city four years earlier in 2016, placed second with 1,241 votes (41.66%). Although she had suspended her campaign before the date of the Missouri primary, U.S. Senator Elizabeth Warren of Massachusetts garnered 35 votes (2.14%) to finish third ahead of U.S. Representative Tulsi Gabbard of Hawaii with 24 votes (0.81%). Former Mayor Michael Bloomberg of New York City followed in fifth with 17 votes (0.57%).

Although he did not face a serious primary challenge in 2020, incumbent President Donald J. Trump clinched 1,818 votes (97.53%) out of the total 1,864 votes cast in the city during the 2020 Republican presidential primaries. Among the 46 defections, 26 (1.40%) voted uncommitted while 10 voters (0.54%) choose former Governor of Massachusetts and 2016 Libertarian Party vice-presidential nominee Bill Weld and six voters (0.32%) opted for former U.S. Representative Joe Walsh of Illinois.

In the 2016 Republican presidential primaries, GOP voters in the city of Cape Girardeau backed U.S. Senator Ted Cruz of Texas with 2,802 votes (47.29 percent) over real estate entrepreneur Donald J. Trump who finished second with 2,159 votes (36.44 percent). Former Governor John R. Kasich of Ohio finished third with 568 votes (9.59 percent) ahead of U.S. Senator Marco Rubio of Florida with 267 votes (4.51 percent).

In the 2016 Democratic presidential primaries, Democratic voters in the city supported U.S. Senator Bernie Sanders of Vermont with 1,334 votes (52.64 percent) over former Secretary of State and U.S. Senator Hillary Rodham Clinton of New York with 1,179 votes (46.53 percent). Likewise, Clinton carried the city eight years earlier in the 2008 Democratic primaries with 2,057 votes (51.43 percent) over former U.S. Senator Barack Obama of neighboring Illinois who received 1,812 votes (45.30 percent) in the city. Former U.S. Senator John Edwards of North Carolina placed third with 102 votes (2.55 percent).

In the 2008 Republican presidential primaries, GOP voters in the city of Cape Girardeau supported former Governor of Massachusetts and current U.S. Senator Mitt Romney of Utah with 1,922 votes (38.48 percent) over former U.S. Senator John McCain of Arizona with 1,592 votes (31.87 percent). Former Governor Mike Huckabee of neighboring Arkansas placed in a not-so-distant third with 1,192 votes (23.86 percent) ahead of former U.S. Representative and libertarian Ron Paul of Texas with 193 votes (3.86 percent).

Education
There are over 20 different schools in Cape Girardeau. These range from pre-kindergarten to higher education. Public and private and parochial school systems are present within the city.

Public schools

The majority of Cape Girardeau (in Cape Girardeau County) is in Cape Girardeau Public Schools.
Alma Schrader Elementary – 1360 Randol Ave
Blanchard Elementary – 1829 N Sprigg St
Clippard Elementary – 2880 Hopper Road
Franklin Elementary – 1550 Themis St
Jefferson Elementary – 520 S Minnesota Ave 
Central Middle School – 1900 Thilenius St
Central Junior High School – 205 Caruthers St
Central Senior High School – 1000 S Silver Springs Road
Career and Technology Center – 1080 S Silver Springs Road
Alternative Education Center – 330 N Spring St

A portion in Cape Girardeau County is in the Jackson R-II School District.

Most of Cape Girardeau in Scott County is in the Scott City R-I School District, while a very small section is in Kelso C-7 School District.

Private schools
Notre Dame High School  – 265 Notre Dame Dr
Trinity Lutheran School – 55 N Pacific St
Eagle Ridge Christian School – 4210 State Highway K
Prodigy Leadership Academy – 232 Sierra Ridge Road
St Mark Lutheran Preschool – 1900 Cape La Croix Road
St. Mary's Cathedral School – 210 S Sprigg St
St. Vincent De Paul Grade School – 1912 Ritter St
Lynwood Christian Academy – 2935 Lynwood Hills Dr

Colleges
Cape Girardeau Partnership for Higher Education – 1080 S Silver Springs Road
Metro Business College – 1732 N Kingshighway St
Southeast Missouri State University – 1 University Plaza
Southeast Hospital College of Nursing & Health Sciences – 2001 William St
Eclipse School-Cosmetology – 52 S Plaza Way
Trend Setters-Cosmetology Inc – 835 S Kingshighway

Public library
The city has one public library: the Municipal Library District of the City of Cape Girardeau.

Transportation

The City of Cape Girardeau has established a Transportation Trust Fund that implements a .5% local sales tax. All of that money is used on transportation improvement projects. General projects are also included to keep the city's streets in good condition.

On June 15, 2000 the Cape Girardeau County Commission passed Resolution 00-06 which formed the Cape Girardeau County Transportation Commission. The CGCTA now offers transportation to the citizens of Cape Girardeau County, which ultimately benefits the citizens of the city of Cape Girardeau. The services that the CGCTA offer are essentially buses and taxis.

In 2011, Cape Girardeau launched the Ride the City campaign. This dedicated 16 miles of bicycle lanes in city streets. There are lanes that are used only by bicycles and lanes where motor vehicles and bicycles can share space.

Public transit
Buses are offered to the citizens by the Cape Transit Authority and have several stops throughout the city. A general admission is $2, senior citizens are $1, and children ages 6 and under are free. Special pick-ups can be made to those who are disabled and live within three-fourths of mile from a designated stop. The Cape Girardeau County Transit Authority handles the city's bus and taxi service. Greyhound buses are also available for long-distance transit. Cape Girardeau is home to local rideshare service, carGO technologies that provides rides from anywhere in Cape Girardeau to surrounding cities such as, Jackson and Scott city.

Air
The City of Cape Girardeau owns the Cape Girardeau Regional Airport. This is a full-service airport that offers flights to and from O'Hare Airport in Chicago, Illinois.

In popular culture
James McMurtry's "Song for a Deck Hand's Daughter" is set in Cape Girardeau.
The novel Killshot by Elmore Leonard is set in this city. The novel was adapted as a 2009 film based on Leonard's novel; numerous scenes were shot on location in Cape Girardeau.
Scenes for the film Gone Girl (2014), which is set in the fictional North Carthage, Missouri, were shot in Cape Girardeau.
The 13th episode of the TV series Supernatural, "Route 666", which is said to take place in Cape Girardeau.
The traditional folk song, "Hang Me, Oh Hang Me", most notably arranged by Dave Van Ronk, features a singer who has traveled the world, specifically mentioning visiting Cape Girardeau. The song was featured in the 2013 film Inside Llewyn Davis, being performed by Oscar Isaac twice in the movie.
In the novel Train Man (1999) by P.T. Deutermann, the Thebes bridge south of Cape Girardeau spanning the Mississippi River to Illinois is a key plot point in the race by FBI investigators to find persons unknown who are sequentially demolishing all railroad bridges that cross the River, causing mayhem and massive delays for all rail transportation in the contiguous United States.
The Glenn House, a historical building in downtown Cape Girardeau that is said to be haunted, was featured on Season 2 Episode 8 of A&E's "Ghost Hunters."
The city features prominently in Peter Meredith's novel series The Undead World.
The novel Darkness: A Slave's Story'' by Jeff Nebeker-Johnson is set in this city.

Notable people
 

 Jacob M. Appel, novelist, lived in Cape Girardeau (1982–1984), set several books in Cape Girardeau
 Leon Brinkopf (1926–1998), shortstop in Major League Baseball for the Chicago Cubs in 1952 born and died in Cape Girardeau
 Karilyn Brown (born c. 1947), born in Cape Girardeau; Republican member of the Arkansas House of Representatives for Pulaski County since 2015
 Joseph Cable, a Medal of Honor recipient during the American Indian Wars
 Shirley Crites (1934–1990), All-American Girls Professional Baseball League player
 A.J. Ellis, former Major League Baseball catcher, born in Cape Girardeau
 John Thomson Faris (1871–1949), clergyman, born in Cape Girardeau
 Mary M. Hagan-Harrell, served in the Missouri House of Representatives, born in Cape Girardeau
 Andrew Conway Ivy, (1893–1978), president of the American Physiological Society (1939–1941)
 Terry Jones (born 1951), fundamentalist pastor of Dove World Outreach Center
 Peter Kinder, 46th Lieutenant Governor of Missouri (2005–2017)
 Richard Kinder, businessman and co-founder and executive chairman of Kinder Morgan, Inc.
 The Limbaugh family, including political commentators, brothers David and Rush Limbaugh
 Stephanie O'Sullivan, Principal Deputy Director of National Intelligence, born in Cape Girardeau
 Susan Beth Scott (born 1992), 2008 and 2012 U.S. Paralympic Medalist Swimmer
 John Locke Scripps (1818–1866), journalist and biographer
 Tony Spinner, guitarist and singer
 Billy Swan, singer who had a #1 hit song named "I Can Help" in 1974.
 Terry Teachout, writer
 Robert Henry Whitelaw (1854–1937), U.S. Congressman
 James Naile (born 1993), Major League Baseball pitcher for the St. Louis Cardinals.

References

External links

 City of Cape Girardeau
 Sanborn Maps of Missouri Collection – Cape Girardeau at the University of Missouri

 
Cities in Missouri
Cities in Cape Girardeau County, Missouri
Cities in Scott County, Missouri
Missouri populated places on the Mississippi River
French colonial settlements of Upper Louisiana